Edmund Randolph Williams (May 1, 1871 – June 9, 1952) was an American attorney from Richmond, Virginia. In 1896, he began practicing law with William Wirt Henry. Shortly after Henry's death, in 1901, he co-founded the law firm Munford, Hunton, Williams & Anderson (now Hunton Andrews Kurth) with Beverley B. Munford, Eppa Hunton Jr., and Henry W. Anderson. He was the most senior member of the firm when he died in 1952. A member of the Virginia Historical Society from 1898, he was president of that organization from 1948 to 1952.

Williams died in Richmond on June 9, 1952, and, after services at St. Paul's Episcopal Church, was buried in Hollywood Cemetery.

References

1871 births
1952 deaths
Burials at Hollywood Cemetery (Richmond, Virginia)
People from Richmond, Virginia
University of Virginia School of Law alumni
Virginia Democrats
19th-century American lawyers
20th-century American lawyers